The 2013 Korean FA Cup, known as the 2013 Hana Bank FA Cup, was the 18th edition of the Korean FA Cup. Pohang Steelers became champions and qualified for the 2014 AFC Champions League.

Schedule

Teams

Qualifying rounds

First round
The draw for the first round was held on 22 February 2013.

Second round
The draw for the second round was held on 13 April 2013.

Final rounds

Bracket

Round of 32
The draw for the round of 32 was held on 18 April 2013.

Round of 16
The draw for the round of 16 was held on 29 May 2013.

Quarter-finals
The draw for the quarter-finals was held on 18 July 2013.

Semi-finals
The draw for the semi-finals was held on 21 August 2013.

Final

Awards

Main awards

Man of the Round

See also
2013 in South Korean football
2013 K League Classic
2013 K League Challenge
2013 Korea National League
2013 Challengers League

References

External links
Official website
Fixtures & Results at KFA

Korean FA Cup seasons
2013 in South Korean football